Parliamentary elections were held in the Gambia on 2 January 1997 three months after presidential elections. The first parliamentary elections since Yahya Jammeh's 1994 coup, they were also the first parliamentary elections to be held under the new constitution approved in a 1996 referendum. However, Decree 89 meant that pre-1994 parties (such as the former ruling People's Progressive Party) were still banned.

The elections were originally scheduled for 11 December 1996, but following an attack on military barracks at Farafenni at the start of November, they were postponed, and all political rallies were banned. Jammeh's Alliance for Patriotic Reorientation and Construction won 33 of the 45 elected seats, enough to change the constitution.

Results

References

Gambia
Parliamentary elections in the Gambia
1997 in the Gambia
January 1997 events in Africa
Election and referendum articles with incomplete results